Pained (lit. "Pain") is a 2011 South Korean film directed by Kwak Kyung-taek. Kwak's first feature in three years, it is a romantic melodrama set in Seoul, which is a departure from the director's previous Busan-based masculine thrillers and gangster movies. It is adapted from an original story by popular webtoon artist Kang Full.

Plot
Debt collector Nam-soon (Kwon Sang-woo) lost his sense of pain after a traumatic accident during his youth, and now regularly takes beatings for his job. Street vendor Dong-hyun (Jung Ryeo-won) suffers from severe hemophilia, a disorder that impedes the body's ability to stop bleeding. For Dong-hyun, even the most minor of injuries could be deadly. She's left homeless after Nam-soon collects the last of her money, so he decides to take her in. As the two grow closer, Nam-soon suddenly begins to lose his lifelong insensitivity to pain and the hurt of a lifetime washes over him. Together, these two lonely souls learn to hurt and hope again...

Cast
Kwon Sang-woo – Nam-soon
Jung Ryeo-won – Dong-hyun
Ma Dong-seok – Bum-no
Jang Young-nam – Kye-jung
Kim Hyeong-jong – jobless guy
Keum Dong-hyun – Young-bae
Lee Mi-do – street vendor
 Mahbub Alam – street vendor
Song Bong-geun – bucktooth
Oh Joo-hee – Nam-soon's aunt
Kang Min-ah – Nam-soon's older sister
Kwak Min-seok – newlywed husband
Kim Yeon-ah – newlywed wife
Kim Jin-goo – grandmother owner
Sa-hee – actress
Kwon Oh-jin – trader representative
Kim Min-jun – male actor (cameo)

References

External links
 

2011 films
2011 romantic drama films
South Korean romantic drama films
Films shot in Seoul
Films shot in Incheon
Films based on manhwa
Films based on works by Kang Full
Films directed by Kwak Kyung-taek
Lotte Entertainment films
2010s Korean-language films
Live-action films based on comics
2010s South Korean films